Five Treasure Island is the first major label Japanese-language studio album by South Korean rock band F.T. Island, released by Warner Music Japan on 18 May 2011. The album placed first on the Oricon daily chart.

Track listing

References

F.T. Island albums
2011 albums
Japanese-language albums
Warner Music Japan albums